Gjeravica Lake or Đeravica Lake is a mountain lake in Kosovo located just under the summit of Gjeravica mountain.

Geography 
It has an area of 2 hectares.
It is shaped like a tooth and is the origin of the Erenik river which flows down to the Metohija region of western Kosovo.

Fauna 
The lake is known for is its many salamanders, which feast on flying insects. 
The Lake contains many fish.

Gallery

References 

Lakes of Kosovo
Glacial lakes
Accursed Mountains